Model airplane fields are used for landings and takeoffs of model aircraft.

Facilities provided vary significantly.  They range from unimproved fields to paved runways.

Most model airfields in the United States have clubs chartered with the Academy of Model Aeronautics, similarly in Canada, their equivalent organization, the Model Aeronautics Association of Canada, provides the same function.

External links 
https://www.rcgroups.com/places/

References 

 
Entertainment lists